Maniam a/l Pachaiappan (born 6 October 1968) is a former Malaysian football player and coach. He is the Head coach for Malaysia M3 League club Harini.

Club career

Selangor

Born in Selangor, Maniam started his career at Selangor, playing with the youth team in 1987.

In 1991, Maniam was the only key member of the squad, and helped his team to win Malaysia FA Cup, after beating Perak in the final by 1–0.

Coach career

Selangor

After guiding Selangor to win the 2006 Youth Cup and 2008 President Cup, Maniam, has been the assistant coach for the Selangor Super League squad for seven seasons from 2009 to 2015.

During the period, Maniam had twice been appointed a caretaker coach while two former coaches, K. Devan and Irfan Bakti Abu Salim resigned in mid-2011 and 2013.

AirAsia FC

On 30 March 2016, Maniam became the coach of AirAsia FC, replacing Mohd Nidzam Jamil for the Malaysia FAM Cup club.

Return to Selangor

On 26 December 2016, Maniam returned to Selangor and been appointed as a new coach after signing a one-year contract with the club.

Honours

Player
Selangor
Malaysia FA Cup: 1991, 1997
Malaysia Cup: 1995, 1996, 1997

Coach / Assistant coach
Selangor
Youth Cup: Champions: 2006
President's Cup: Champions: 2008
Charity Shield: 2009, 2010
Malaysia Super League: 2009, 2010
Malaysia FA Cup: 2009
Malaysia Cup: 2015

References

1968 births
Living people
Malaysia international footballers
Association football forwards
Malaysian footballers
Malaysian people of Tamil descent
Malaysian sportspeople of Indian descent
Footballers at the 1994 Asian Games
Asian Games competitors for Malaysia